Hungry Shark is a series of arcade-style RPG games developed and published by Future Games of London (prior to Hungry Shark Evolution) and Ubisoft (since Hungry Shark Evolution). The games allow players to control several unique species of sharks, including mako sharks, great white sharks, hammerhead sharks, reef sharks, megamouth shark, megalodon, basking sharks and whale sharks. To progress, the player must consume other marine animals and grow in size until the next, more powerful shark is available for purchase. In May 2016, Hungry Shark World was downloaded 10 million times in six days, reaching the top 10 free iPhone and Android apps. In 2018, Hungry Shark World was released for the Xbox One, PlayStation 4 and Nintendo Switch. It featured better graphics, and the complete removal of micro transactions. In 2022, it reached 1 billion players.

Editions of Hungry Shark

Hungry Shark Trilogy (2010–2011)
 Hungry Shark: Part 1
The first game in the trilogy and the first in the series.
 Hungry Shark: Part 2
A sequel to the previous game.
 Hungry Shark: Part 3
The final game in the trilogy.
 Hungry Shark: Trilogy re-release
A compilation of the first 3 games, updated with HD graphics.

Hungry Shark: Night (2011) 
The final game to be published solely by Future Games of London.

Hungry Shark Evolution (2012)
The first Hungry Shark game originally released by Future Games of London in 2012 and later published by Ubisoft in 2013 after the studio was officially acquired by the latter.

Hungry Shark World (2016)
A sequel to Hungry Shark Evolution, reached 30 million downloads on Google Play Store.  The game includes 33 of new sharks and many returning ones.  The game is still being updated today.

Hungry Shark VR (2017)
A version of Hungry Shark that is in VR and runs on Google Daydream.

Hungry Dragon (2018)
A spinoff of Hungry Shark, where the player controls a flying dragon. This installment was not created by Future Games of London, instead being published and developed by Ubisoft Barcelona Mobile.

Hungry Shark Arena (2020)
Hungry Shark Arena is an online multiplayer shark battle royale game. The HTML5 game is available Desktop and Mobile.

Gameplay 
Hungry Shark revolves around the player, a lone shark, consuming various marine species to grow in size until the subsequent, more powerful sharks are unlocked. The number of species the player is able to consume depends on the strength of the shark; for instance, a reef shark cannot eat lionfish, but a great white shark is able to, or a megamouth shark (Hungry Shark World) is unable to eat small mines, but a megalodon is able to. Not all creatures can be consumed, and some are hostile towards the shark.

As the player progresses, the hazards posed to them increase; helicopters may begin dropping explosive barrels into the sea, or fisherman may seek out the player in an attempt to end their frenzy. In addition to these foes, the shark's health constantly deteriorates and can only be restored when food is consumed; if the player goes without food for too long, the shark will die. Some sharks possess a unique ability (such as freezing breath or a boost) that can be upgraded.

Like many other mobile games, the Hungry Shark series offers each game for free but charges real world money for additional gold (which can be acquired by playing the game) and gems (which can also be collected in the game). This freemium model has been met with criticism from some journalists.

Accolades
Hungry Shark World was nominated for "Best Casual Game" at The Independent Game Developers' Association Awards 2018.

Animated series
An animated series titled Hungry Shark Squad is in development at Ubisoft Motion Pictures.

References

Mobile games
Ubisoft games
Ubisoft franchises
Sharks
Video games about animals